The Saddle Brook Public Schools are a comprehensive community public school district that serves students in pre-kindergarten through twelfth grade from Saddle Brook, in Bergen County, New Jersey, United States.

As of the 2018–19 school year, the district, comprising five schools, had an enrollment of 1,798 students and 150.1 classroom teachers (on an FTE basis), for a student–teacher ratio of 12.0:1.

The district's schools are accredited by the New Jersey Department of Education.

The district is classified by the New Jersey Department of Education as being in District Factor Group "DE", the fifth-highest of eight groupings. District Factor Groups organize districts statewide to allow comparison by common socioeconomic characteristics of the local districts. From lowest socioeconomic status to highest, the categories are A, B, CD, DE, FG, GH, I and J.

Schools
Schools in the district (with 2018–19 enrollment data from the National Center for Education Statistics) are:
Preschool / special education
Washington School which houses a number of the district's early intervention special education programs, with 54 students in PreK
Elementary schools
Franklin Elementary School with 320 students in grades K-6
Lori Cohen, Principal
Salome H. Long Memorial Elementary School with 272 students in grades K-6
Jaynellen Jenkins, Principal
Helen I. Smith Elementary School with 311 students in grades K-6
Deborah Wunder, Principal
High School
Saddle Brook High/Middle School with 794 students in grades 7-12, combining both middle school and high school in a single building
Brenda Coffey, Principal

Construction projects
The district underwent a $23 million expansion and renovation campaign to update facilities and providing new instructional space for its growing enrollment.  Renovations at the three elementary schools were completed toward the conclusion of the 2004-05 school year with full occupancy at the opening of the 2005-06 school year in September.  At the middle/high school, two large additions went up during the school year. One area houses a state-of-the-art library/media center and six new classrooms, while the other area houses a new gymnasium/fitness center.  Renovations that began in the summer of 2005 brought updated science labs to the middle/high school.

Administration
Core members of the district's administration are:
Danielle Shanley, Superintendent
Raymond Karaty, Business Administrator / Board Secretary

Board of education
The district's board of education, with nine members, sets policy and oversees the fiscal and educational operation of the district through its administration. As a Type II school district, the board's trustees are elected directly by voters to serve three-year terms of office on a staggered basis, with three seats up for election each year held (since 2012) as part of the November general election. The board appoints a superintendent to oversee the day-to-day operation of the district.

References

External links
Saddle Brook Public Schools
 
School Data for the Saddle Brook Public Schools. National Center for Education Statistics

Saddle Brook, New Jersey
New Jersey District Factor Group DE
School districts in Bergen County, New Jersey